The 2010–11 Championnat National season was the 13th since its establishment. Évian were the defending champions. The fixtures were announced on 5 July 2010 and the season began on 6 August and ended on 27 May 2011. The winter break was in effect between 22 December and 11 January 2011. There were four promoted teams from the Championnat de France amateur, replacing the four teams that were relegated from the Championnat National following the 2009–10 season. A total of 21 teams currently competes in the league with five clubs suffering relegation to the fourth division, the Championnat de France amateur. All clubs that secured league status for the season were subject to approval by the DNCG before becoming eligible to participate.

On 22 April 2011, Bastia became the first club to achieve promotion to Ligue 2 following the club's 1–1 draw with Fréjus Saint-Raphaël. Coupled with fourth-place Strasbourg's draw with Luzenac on the same day, the results made it mathematically impossible for the Alsatians to catch Bastia in the standings. Two weeks later, following a 2–1 win over Créteil and a 1–1 draw between second-place Amiens and Cannes, Bastia were declared champions of the Championnat National. On 13 May, Amiens became the second club to achieve promotion to Ligue 2 after defeating third-place rivals Guingamp 3–1. Guingamp later achieved promotion on the final day of the season after defeating Rouen 3–1.

On 9 April 2011, Gueugnon were forced by a commercial tribunal of the commune of Mâcon to enter liquidation as a result of the club's debts and its repeated delays of paying its players. As a result of the ruling, the French Football Federation forfeited Gueugnon's remaining matches in the league giving 3–0 victories to the opposition, which resulted in the club's automatic relegation. On 26 April, Alfortville became the second club to suffer relegation to the Championnat de France amateur following its 2–0 loss away to Niort. On the final day of the season, Plabennec, Rodez, and Bayonne were relegated to the Championnat de France amateur.

Teams

Team changes 

On 7 May 2010, the first movement of clubs in the league occurred following Bastia's relegation from Ligue 2. The club drew 0–0 with Tours which, following a positive result for Strasbourg on the same day, made it mathematically impossible for the club to remain in Ligue 2. On 14 May, on the final day of the Ligue 2 season, Strasbourg and Guingamp were both relegated to the Championnat National. Guingamp, who played in the UEFA Europa League due to the club's Coupe de France triumph the previous season, won its final league match, but, due to other results, finished in 18th position. Strasbourg, who were one of the favourites to earn promotion to the first division, lost on the final day and the club's relegation was confirmed following other results. Strasbourg had suffered relegation from Ligue 1 to the second division the previous season meaning the club faltered down two divisions in just two seasons.

On 8 May, Niort became the first club to achieve promotion to the Championnat National from the Championnat France de amateur. The club defeated Pau 4–0 on the match day. Following second place club Yzeure's 2–1 loss to the reserves of Le Mans, Niort's promotion was assured. A week later, Orléans achieved promotion following the club's 2–1 victory over the Caen reserves. The victory assured the club a spot in National and also pushed the club over 100 points; a rarity in the fourth division. On 22 May, Colmar earned promotion to National, despite drawing 2–2 with relegation-bound Marck. The club's promotion was guaranteed following Alfortville's 2–1 loss to Amnéville.

Colmar's place in the league came up for discussion after Alfortville, the second-place finisher in the group, appealed to the French Football Federation to award the club a 3–0 victory over the reserves of Lens after it was determined that Lens played with a suspended player. The ruling was determined on 26 June with the Comité National Olympique et Sportif Français (CNOSF) giving an unfavorable ruling to Alfortville. Following the ruling, Alfortville announced its intent to appeal to a Tribunal administratif, however, on 16 July, the French Football Federation stepped in an ruled in favour of Alfortville giving the club a place in the Championnat National. Colmar will remain in the league alongside Alfortville, thus giving National a league of 21 clubs. On 29 May, the final day of the season, the final CFA club achieved promotion to National. Gap defeated the reserves of Lyon 3–0 to claim the final berth in the third division.

Teams relegated to Championnat National
 Guingamp
 Strasbourg
 Bastia

Teams promoted to Championnat National
 Colmar (Groupe A winners and champions)
 Gap (Groupe B winners)
 Niort (Groupe C winners)
 Orléans (Groupe D winners)
 Alfortville (Groupe A runner-up)

DNCG rulings 
On 15 June 2010, following a review of each club's administrative and financial accounts in the Championnat National, the DNCG ruled that both Bastia and Gueugnon would be relegated to the Championnat de France amateur, while Amiens, Guingamp, and Strasbourg were having its accounts subjected to further deliberation to determine whether each club could retain its professional status. Both Bastia and Gueugnon had the option to appeal the decision. On 25 June 2010, the Corsican Assembly and the General Council of Haute-Corse approved grants of €800,000 and €150,000 to be given to Bastia in order for the club to meet the DNCG's financial requirements, which would allow the club to remain in the Championnat National. However, on 6 July, the DNCG remained firm on its stance relegating the club to the fourth division after questioning the legitimacy of the grants and the sale of the club's training center. Bastia president, Julien Lolli, remained confident that the club would play in the Championnat National and issued an appeal to the CNOSF, the National Sporting Committee of France, the same day. On 2 July, the DNCG announced that Gueugnon would remain in National after the club successfully appealed to the organisation. On 16 July, the CNOSF ruled against the DNCG and announced that Bastia should play in the Championnat National. The club's place in the league was confirmed upon the release of the league table.

On 2 July, local media in Alsace reported that Strasbourg were on the verge of being relegated to the Championnat de France amateur by the DNCG due to financial issues. The club responded by announcing its willingness to appeal if the news reported was confirmed. With the club's accounts still being reviewed, Strasbourg's financial issues were slightly alleviated after the sale of striker Magaye Gueye to English club Everton for €1.4 million. Strasbourg later transferred captain Guillaume Lacour and Algerian international Yacine Bezzaz to Évian and Troyes, respectively, for nominal fees. On 16 July, the report was confirmed when the DNCG officially relegated Strasbourg to the CFA. Strasbourg appealed the decision the following week. On 22 July, Strasbourg's appeal was successful with the DNCG ruling in favour of a return to National. The return of Strasbourg to National means that twenty-one clubs competed in the 2010–11 edition of the league.

Stadia and locations 

1Source

Personnel and kits 

1 Subject to change during the season.

Managerial changes

League table

Results

Statistics

Top goalscorers 

Last updated: 23 May 2011  Source: French Football Federation

Best player 
For the second consecutive season, the French Football Federation will award a trophy to the Best Player of the Championnat National. The award is based on a points-system with each manager of each club in the league voting for two players not on their team following each match day. Depending on their selection, the two players voted by each manager are given points of either three or one. During the season, the points are added up every week and, following the season, the player with the most points is awarded the honour. The current winner of the award is Plabennec midfielder Laurent David.

Last updated: 27 April 2011
Source: Best Player Standings

References

External links 
 Official site

2010-11
3
France